Vibha Parthasarathi (born 13 September 1940) is an Indian educationist. She served as the chairperson of the National Commission for Women, India from 1999 to 2002.

Background
Vibha Parthasarathi was educated at Cambridge University and Boston University. She was Principal of New Delhi's Sardar Patel Vidyalaya.

She currently serves on the advisory board of Peepul India, an education non-profit working to transform India's public school system in partnership with the government.

National Commission of Women
Vibha Parthasarathi was nominated by the NDA government as the Chairperson of the National Commission for Women in July 1999. Her term ended in 2002.

References

1952 births
Living people
Indian women educational theorists
20th-century Indian educational theorists
20th-century women educators
20th-century Indian women